Omar Rekik (born 20 December 2001) is a professional footballer who plays as a centre-back for EFL Championship club Wigan Athletic, on loan from Arsenal. Born in the Netherlands, he represents the Tunisia national team. His brother, Karim, is also a professional footballer.

Early life 
Born in Helmond, Netherlands, from a Tunisian father and a Dutch mother, Rekik was part of several big European clubs during his youth career, following his brother Karim from Feyenoord, to Manchester City, then PSV and Marseille, before joining Hertha Berlin in 2017.
However their career eventually split during the 2020–21 season, as Omar was transferred from the Bundesliga side to Arsenal  in January 2021. Karim, who had already been playing professional football for the last ten years, had joined the Spanish side of Sevilla a few months earlier.

Club career
On 31 January 2023, Omar joined Wigan Athletic in the EFL Championship on loan until the end of the season.

International career 
While Karim was already a 4 time capped Dutch international, Omar Rekik was first selected in the Tunisia under-21 selection in October 2018, while aged only 16, before joining the Netherlands under-18 a month later.

But Omar Rekik eventually decided to join the Tunisian national team in May 2021, as he was selected by Mondher Kebaier along with other young players such as Hannibal Mejbri. He made his international senior debut for Tunisia on 15 June 2021, starting as a midfielder in the 1-0 friendly win against Mali.

Career statistics

References

External links

Omar Rekik KNVB profile

2001 births
Living people
Sportspeople from Helmond
Footballers from North Brabant
Citizens of Tunisia through descent
Tunisian footballers
Tunisia international footballers
Tunisia youth international footballers
Dutch footballers
Netherlands youth international footballers
Tunisian people of Dutch descent
Dutch people of Tunisian descent
Association football central defenders
Manchester City F.C. players
Feyenoord players
Olympique de Marseille players
Hertha BSC players
Arsenal F.C. players
Sparta Rotterdam players
Tunisian expatriate footballers
Tunisian expatriate sportspeople in England
Tunisian expatriate sportspeople in Germany
Tunisian expatriate sportspeople in France
Dutch expatriate footballers
Dutch expatriate sportspeople in England
Dutch expatriate sportspeople in Germany
Dutch expatriate sportspeople in France
Expatriate footballers in England
Expatriate footballers in Germany
Expatriate footballers in France
2021 Africa Cup of Nations players
Tweede Divisie players
Eredivisie players
English Football League players
Wigan Athletic F.C. players
Regionalliga players